"A World Without Love" is a song co-written and recorded by American country music artist Eddie Rabbitt.  It was released in October 1985 as the first single from the album Rabbitt Trax.  The song reached number 10 on the Billboard Hot Country Singles & Tracks chart.  It was written by Rabbitt, Even Stevens and Phil Galdston.

Chart performance

References

1985 singles
1985 songs
Eddie Rabbitt songs
Songs written by Eddie Rabbitt
RCA Records singles
Song recordings produced by Richard Landis
Songs written by Phil Galdston
Songs written by Even Stevens (songwriter)